All American Group (formerly Coachmen Industries) was an American company whose divisions produced pre-fabricated housing.  Based in Elkhart, Indiana, it was founded in 1964 as Coachmen Industries. It was listed on the New York Stock Exchange under the symbol COA until 2009, when it was delisted for failing to maintain continued NYSE listing standards.

History
Coachmen Industries was founded by three brothers: Tom Corson, Keith Corson and Claude Corson. The brothers started the company in a  plant in downtown Middlebury, Indiana producing 12 travel trailer models, 1 truck camper style and 80 truck caps. Since 1964, Coachmen Companies have produced nearly 600,000 recreational vehicles of all sizes and types.

In December 2008, the company sold all of the assets of its RV Group to Forest River, Inc., a unit of Berkshire Hathaway. Another division, All American Specialty Vehicles, a joint venture with ARBOC Mobility, manufactured ADA-accessible buses. All American merged into Arboc in 2011.

The company continued to operate in the modular housing business under the ALL AMERICAN HOMES and MOD-U-KRAF brand names. All American was acquired by Innovative Building Systems in 2011. Innovative filed for bankruptcy in 2016 and closed American Homes and Mod-U-Kraf.

References

External links
All American Homes website
Mod-U-Kraf website

Defunct motor vehicle manufacturers of the United States
Vehicle manufacturing companies established in 1964
Companies based in Elkhart County, Indiana
Motor vehicle manufacturers based in Indiana
1964 establishments in Indiana
2008 mergers and acquisitions
2011 mergers and acquisitions
Manufacturing companies disestablished in 2016
2016 disestablishments in Indiana